The Helm Wind is a named wind in Cumbria, England, a strong north-easterly wind which blows down the south-west slope of the Cross Fell escarpment. It is the only named wind in the British Isles, although many other mountain regions in Britain exhibit the same phenomenon when the weather conditions are favourable. It may take its name from the helmet or cap of cloud which forms above Cross Fell, known as the Helm Bar, since a line of clouds over the fells can predict and accompany a Helm. Research into the helm wind was carried out by Gordon Manley in the 1930s. He interpreted the phenomenon in hydrodynamic terms as a "standing wave" and "rotor", a model confirmed in 1939 by glider flights.

The dale at the head of the Eden Valley has its own Helm Wind, which sweeps over Mallerstang Edge, particularly affecting the central part of the dale. This can be similarly fierce and can blow for two days or more, sometimes sounding like an express train. As with the wind at Cross Fell, its arrival is accompanied by the formation of a dense cap of cloud (a "Helm Bar") which, in this case, forms along the high ground on the eastern side of the dale.

References

External links
 Example of a Helm Bar taken from near Appleby in Westmorland on April 3rd 2007
 Helm Wind article on a website that specialises in "wind of the world".

Climate of England
Föhn effect
Geography of Cumbria
Winds
Pennines

pl:Wiatr#Lokalne wiatry nazwane